Heilwood is a census-designated place (CDP) in Indiana County, Pennsylvania, United States. The population was 711 at the time of the 2010 census.

Geography
Heilwood is located at  (40.637259, -78.882627).

Demographics

At the 2000 census there were 786 people, 304 households, and 221 families in the CDP. The population density was 204.0 people per square mile (78.8/km). There were 326 housing units at an average density of 84.6/sq mi (32.7/km). The racial makeup of the CDP was 99.49% White, 0.25% African American, 0.13% Native American, and 0.13% from two or more races. Hispanic or Latino of any race were 0.13%.

There were 304 households, 32.9% had children under the age of 18 living with them, 56.3% were married couples living together, 11.8% had a female householder with no husband present, and 27.0% were non-families. 26.0% of households were made up of individuals, and 16.1% were one person aged 65 or older. The average household size was 2.59 and the average family size was 3.09.

The age distribution was 24.8% under the age of 18, 9.2% from 18 to 24, 26.1% from 25 to 44, 21.9% from 45 to 64, and 18.1% 65 or older. The median age was 39 years. For every 100 females, there were 91.7 males. For every 100 females age 18 and over, there were 88.8 males.

The median household income was $29,722 and the median family income was $35,000. Males had a median income of $28,819 versus $21,591 for females. The per capita income for the CDP was $12,487. About 13.3% of families and 17.0% of the population were below the poverty line, including 29.2% of those under age 18 and 7.7% of those age 65 or over.

Notable person
Augie Donatelli, MLB umpire

References

External links
 The Early History of Heilwood - A Western Pennsylvania Coal Mining Town

Census-designated places in Indiana County, Pennsylvania
Census-designated places in Pennsylvania